TV Justiça (Justice TV in Portuguese) is a Brazilian television channel owned by the Brazilian Judicial branch and administered by the Brazilian Supreme Federal Court. It was launched on August 11, 2002.

The channel is dedicated mainly to the live broadcasting of judgments in the Supreme Federal Court and the Superior Court of Justice, but there are also news, debates, movies and dictatic programmes included in its schedule.

It is available nationally on cable television and on the Internet . In the Federal District, it is also available on digital terrestrial channel 48 UHF.

References

External links
  TV Justiça Official Webpage
  Supreme Federal Court Homepage

Television networks in Brazil
Portuguese-language television stations in Brazil
Television channels and stations established in 2002
2002 establishments in Brazil